Skočná is a rapid Slavic folk-dance, normally in  metre. Czech composers Antonín Dvořák and Bedřich Smetana used this dance, the latter in the third act of The Bartered Bride where it is danced by a circus troupe and is often known as the Dance of the Comedians. Dvořák's 5th, 7th and 11th Slavonic Dances are in the form of the skočná.

References

European folk dances
Dance forms in classical music